Jonas Hiller (born 12 February 1982) is a Swiss former professional ice hockey goaltender. Hiller played in the National Hockey League (NHL) for the Calgary Flames and the Anaheim Ducks, the latter with which he began his NHL career with in 2007 after going undrafted in any NHL Entry Draft. Hiller also played in the National League (NL) with HC Davos and EHC Biel.

Playing career
As a youth, Hiller played in the 1996 Quebec International Pee-Wee Hockey Tournament with a team from Zürich.

While playing for HC Davos, Hiller won Switzerland's championship in 2002, 2005 and 2007, as well as the Spengler Cup in 2004 and 2006. In 2006–07, Hiller set a career-high win record with 28–16–0 in 44 games. Following the conclusion of the season, he was signed as an undrafted free agent by the NHL's Anaheim Ducks in May 2007.

Hiller made his debut for the Ducks on 30 September 2007, defeating the Los Angeles Kings 4–1 in London, England. He allowed 1 goal on 23 shots for the win.

Ducks general manager Brian Burke quickly felt Hiller was ready to become full-time backup to Jean-Sébastien Giguère, and as a result, placed backup Ilya Bryzgalov on waivers, where he was claimed by the Phoenix Coyotes. Hiller went on to record a 2.06 goals against average (GAA) and .926 save percentage in 23 games in his first NHL season, 2007–08.

Hiller recorded his first career NHL shutout in the 2008–09 season, defeating the Los Angeles Kings, 2–0. Following his strong regular season play, the Ducks named Hiller their starting goaltender for the 2009 Stanley Cup playoffs over incumbent starter Giguère. Hiller started his first career playoff game on 16 April 2009, recording a shutout over the San Jose Sharks in a 35-save performance. He and the Ducks ousted the Presidents' Trophy-winning Sharks in six games, marking only the fourth time in NHL history that the Presidents' Trophy-winning team had been eliminated in the playoffs' first round. The Ducks next matchup was the second-seeded Detroit Red Wings, a series which Detroit won in seven games. Nonetheless, many felt that it was only due to Hiller's goaltending that the Ducks were able to take the defending Stanley Cup champions to seven games.

Midway through the next season, on 30 January 2010, Hiller signed a four-year contract extension with the Ducks going through to the 2013–14 season. The next day, the Ducks traded Giguère to the Toronto Maple Leafs, cementing Hiller's status as the Ducks' starting goaltender.

During the lockout-shortened 2012–13 season, Hiller helped the Ducks place second overall in the Western Conference. During the 2013 playoffs, however, the Ducks were eliminated in a seven-game series against the Detroit Red Wings for the second time in five years.

On 1 July 2014, after his contract had expired with Anaheim, Hiller signed a two-year contract as an unrestricted free agent with the Calgary Flames at an annual average of $4.5 million. In his first season in Calgary, 2014–15, he emerged as the Flames' starting goaltender, partaking in most of the Flames' regular season games and 7 of the Flames' 11 2015 playoff games. In Game 6 in the first round of the playoffs, he was pulled in favour of backup Karri Rämö after conceding two goals on three shots. Hiller started Game 1 of the second round against his former team, the Ducks, but was again pulled in favour Rämö. Rämö was in goal the rest of the series as the Flames lost in five games.

Hiller struggled throughout the 2015–16 season, recording a 9–11–1 record with a 3.51 GAA. Calgary opted not to re-sign Hiller or Rämö, instead acquiring Brian Elliott from the St. Louis Blues after the season to replace them.

On 19 April 2016, Hiller agreed to a three-year contract with EHC Biel of the Swiss National League A (NLA) worth CHF 2.1 million. On August 27, 2018, Hiller was signed to an early one-year contract extension by EHC Biel, through the 2019-20 season. Before the 2019-20 season, Hiller announced his intention to retire from professional hockey at the conclusion of the season, after a 4-year stint with EHC Biel.

On March 16, 2020, Hiller officially announced his retirement from professional hockey.

Vertigo-like symptoms
Hiller earned a spot in the 2011 NHL All-Star Game, held in Raleigh, North Carolina, on 30 January. On 2 February, after his first game returning from the All-Star weekend, Hiller felt lightheaded and was slow to react, allowing three goals on ten shots in the opening period of a 4–3 loss against the visiting San Jose Sharks. He sat out the next four games before shutting-out the Edmonton Oilers 4–0 on 13 February, but the symptoms reappeared. Hiller then sat out another 15 games, making what would be his last appearance of the season during a 5–4 loss to the Nashville Predators on 24 March.

The Ducks acquired veteran goaltenders Ray Emery and Dan Ellis in separate February deals, and the pair played all playoff minutes as the Ducks were eliminated in the first round by Nashville. Emery, an unrestricted free agent, eventually signed with the Chicago Blackhawks during the off-season.

In August 2011, Hiller said he was symptom-free. Ellis was retained as the team's backup goaltender.

International play

Hiller played in goal for Switzerland at the 2010 Winter Olympics in Vancouver, British Columbia. Switzerland finished in eighth place, losing to the United States in the quarterfinal round. He also played goalie for Switzerland in the 2014 Winter Olympics in Sochi, where Switzerland finished in ninth place, losing to Latvia in the qualification playoffs.

Personal life
Hiller is fluent in English, German and French. He is a butterfly style goaltender.

Career statistics

Regular season and playoffs

NLA/NL totals do not include numbers from the 2000–01 and 2002–03 seasons.

International

Awards and honours

Records
 Shares record for most consecutive wins in one NHL regular season – 14 (December 6, 2013 to January 12, 2014)

References

External links

Jonas Hiller biography at hockeygoalies.org

1982 births
Anaheim Ducks players
EHC Biel players
Calgary Flames players
HC La Chaux-de-Fonds players
HC Davos players
Ice hockey players at the 2010 Winter Olympics
Ice hockey players at the 2014 Winter Olympics
Ice hockey players at the 2018 Winter Olympics
Lausanne HC players
Living people
National Hockey League All-Stars
Olympic ice hockey players of Switzerland
People from Frauenfeld District
Portland Pirates players
Swiss ice hockey goaltenders
Undrafted National Hockey League players
Sportspeople from Thurgau